Calotes medogensis, the Medog bloodsucker, is a species of agamid lizard. It is endemic to Tibet (China).

References

Calotes
Reptiles of China
Endemic fauna of Tibet
Reptiles described in 1984
Taxa named by Zhao Ermi